Crassispira acuticosta is an extinct species of sea snail, a marine gastropod mollusk in the family Pseudomelatomidae, the turrids and allies.

Distribution
Fossils have been found in Oligocene strata in Limburg, Belgium.

References

 d'Orbigny, Alcide Dessalines. Prodrome de paléontologie stratigraphique universelle des animaux mollusques & rayonnés: faisant suite au Cours élémentaire de paléontologie et de géologie stratigraphiques. Vol. 2. V. Masson, 1852.

acuticosta
Gastropods described in 1845